Ferdinand (Ferdinand Viktor Albert Meinrad; 24 August 1865 – 20 July 1927), nicknamed Întregitorul ("the Unifier"), was King of Romania from 1914 until his death in 1927. Ferdinand was the second son of Leopold, Prince of Hohenzollern and Infanta Antónia of Portugal, daughter of Ferdinand II of Portugal and Maria II of Portugal. His family was part of the Catholic branch of the Prussian royal family Hohenzollern.

In 1889, Ferdinand became Crown Prince of the Kingdom of Romania, following the renunciation of his father (in 1880) and older brother, William (in 1886), to the rights of succession to the royal crown of Romania. From the moment he settled in Romania, he continued his military career, gaining a series of honorary commands and being promoted to the rank of corps general. He married in 1893 Princess Maria Alexandra Victoria, later known as Queen Marie of Romania, granddaughter of Queen Victoria and Emperor Alexander II and daughter of Alfred, Duke of Saxe-Coburg and Gotha and Grand Duchess Maria Alexandrovna of Russia.

Ferdinand became King of Romania on 10 October 1914, under the name Ferdinand I, following the death of his uncle, King Carol I. He ruled Romania during World War I, choosing to side with the Triple Entente against the Central Powers. This led to Kaiser Wilhelm II of Germany removing his name from the royal house of Hohenzollern. At the war's end, Romania emerged as a much-enlarged kingdom due to Bessarabia, Bukovina and Transylvania and parts of Banat, Crișana, and Maramureș becoming part of the Kingdom of Romania in 1920, and Ferdinand was crowned king of "Greater Romania" in a grand ceremony in 1922. In the years following the establishment of Greater Romania, Romanian society went through a series of major transformations, especially to the application of the agrarian reform and of the universal vote. In 1925, his eldest son, Prince Carol, gave up the rights of succession to the royal crown of Romania leading to a dynastic crisis, as the next prince in line of succession was Carol's 4-year-old son, Prince Michael. This led Ferdinand to remove Prince Carol's name from the royal house of Romania.

Ferdinand died from cancer in 1927 and was succeeded by his grandson Michael under a regency formed by 3 people: Prince Nicholas of Romania, the younger brother of Prince Carol; patriarch Miron Cristea; and president of the Supreme Court of Justice Gheorghe Buzdugan.

Early life

Prince Ferdinand Viktor Albert Meinrad of Hohenzollern-Sigmaringen was born in Sigmaringen in southwestern Germany. The name was later shortened simply to Hohenzollern after the extinction of the Hohenzollern-Hechingen branch in 1869. The princes of Hohenzollern-Sigmaringen had ruled the principality until 1850, when it was annexed to Prussia.

Ferdinand I was the son of Leopold, Prince of Hohenzollern-Sigmaringen, and Infanta Antónia of Portugal (1845–1913), daughter of Queen Maria II of Portugal and Prince Ferdinand of Saxe-Coburg and Gotha, heir to the Hungarian magnates of Koháry on his mother's side.

Following the renunciations, first of his father in 1880 and then of his elder brother Prince Wilhelm of Hohenzollern-Sigmaringen in 1886, young Ferdinand became the heir-presumptive to the throne of his childless uncle, King Carol I of Romania, who would reign until his death in October 1914. In 1889, the Romanian parliament recognized Ferdinand as a prince of Romania. The Romanian government did not require his conversion to Eastern Orthodoxy from Catholicism, as was the common practice prior to this date, thus allowing him to continue with his born creed, but it was required that his children be raised Orthodox, the state religion of Romania. For agreeing to this, Ferdinand was excommunicated from the Catholic Church, although this was later lifted.

Ferdinand's mother's first cousin Tsar Ferdinand I of Bulgaria sat on the throne of the neighbouring Bulgaria beginning in 1887, and was to become the greatest opponent of the kingdom of his Romanian cousins. The neighboring Emperor Francis Joseph, monarch of Austria-Hungary and as such, ruler of Transylvania, was Ferdinand's grandmother's first cousin.

Ferdinand, a complete stranger in his new home, started to get close to one of Queen Elisabeth's ladies in waiting, Elena Văcărescu. Elisabeth, the Queen consort of Romania, very close to Elena herself, encouraged the romance, although she was perfectly aware of the fact that a marriage between the two was forbidden by the Romanian constitution (according to the 1866 Constitution of Romania, the heir-presumptive to the throne was not allowed to marry a Romanian).

The affair caused a sort of dynastic crisis in 1891. The result of this was the exile of both Elisabeth (in Neuwied) and Elena (in Paris), as well as a trip by Ferdinand through Europe in search of a suitable bride, whom he eventually found in Queen Victoria's granddaughter, Princess Marie of Edinburgh.

Marriage

In Sigmaringen on 10 January 1893, Prince Ferdinand of Romania married his distant cousin, the Lutheran Princess Marie of Edinburgh, daughter of Anglican Prince Alfred, Duke of Edinburgh, and the Orthodox Grand Duchess Marie Alexandrovna of Russia. Marie and Ferdinand were third cousins in descent from Franz Frederick Anton, Duke of Saxe-Coburg-Saalfeld. Marie's paternal grandparents were Victoria of the United Kingdom and Prince Albert of Saxe-Coburg-Gotha; her maternal grandparents were Alexander II of Russia and Marie of Hesse and by Rhine. The reigning emperor of neighbouring Russia at the time of the marriage was Marie's uncle, Tsar Alexander III, who would be succeeded by his eldest son, Marie's first cousin, Tsar Nicholas II, the following year.

The royal Romanian marriage produced three sons (Carol, Nicholas, and Mircea – the last of whom died in infancy) and three daughters (Elisabeta, Maria – called "Mignon" – and Ileana), but it was unhappy. Indeed, the couple's two youngest children, Ileana and Mircea, are widely believed to have been sired by Marie's long-time lover, Barbu Știrbey.

King of Romania
On 10 October 1914, Ferdinand's uncle, Carol I, died without surviving issue. Ferdinand succeeded him as King of Romania, reigning until his own death on 20 July 1927.

Ferdinand was appointed as the 1,174th Knight of the Order of the Golden Fleece in Austria in 1909 and as the 868th Knight of the Order of the Garter in 1924.

World War I

Though a member of a cadet branch of Germany's ruling Hohenzollern imperial family, Ferdinand presided over his country's entry into World War I on the side of the Triple Entente against the Central Powers, on 27 August 1916. Thus he gained the sobriquet "the Loyal", having kept the oath he swore before the Romanian Parliament in 1914: "I will reign as a good Romanian."

As a consequence of this "betrayal" of his German origin, German Emperor Wilhelm II had Ferdinand's name erased from the Hohenzollern House register.

Despite the setbacks after the entry into war, when Dobruja and Wallachia were occupied by the Central Powers, Romania fought in 1917 and stopped the German advance into Moldavia. When the new Bolshevik government of Russia sued for peace in 1918, Romania was surrounded by the Central Powers and forced to conclude a peace treaty of its own; however, Ferdinand refused to sign and ratify the Treaty of Bucharest. Allied forces then advanced on the Thessaloniki front and they knocked Bulgaria out of the war. Ferdinand ordered the re-mobilization of the Romanian Army, and Romania re-entered the war on the side of the Triple Entente.

The outcome of Romania's war effort was the union of Bessarabia, Bukovina, and Transylvania with the Kingdom of Romania in 1918. Ferdinand became the ruler of a greatly enlarged Romanian state in 1918–1920 following the victory of the Entente over the Central Powers, a war between the Kingdom of Romania and the new Hungarian Soviet Republic, and the Russian civil war. He was crowned king of "Greater Romania" in a spectacular ceremony on 15 October 1922 in the courtyard of the newly consecrated "Coronation Cathedral" in the historic princely seat of Alba Iulia in Transylvania.

A new period of Romanian history began on the day of the Union of Transylvania with Romania (Great Union Day, Marea Unire). This period would come to an end with international treaties, in the years leading to World War II, which ceded parts of Romania to its neighbors. As such, they are widely seen as an attempt to provoke the country into taking sides and joining the war.

After the war
Owing to the war, Ferdinand's coronation was delayed until 15 October 1922.

Domestic political life during his reign was dominated by the conservative National Liberal Party, which was led by the brothers Ion and Vintilă Brătianu. The acquisition of Transylvania had the unintended effect of enlarging the electoral base of the opposition, whose principal parties united in January 1925 – October 1926 to form the National Peasant Party.

Death
Ferdinand died from cancer in Sinaia in 1927, and was succeeded by his grandson Michael under a regency (King Michael's father having renounced his rights to the throne in December 1925). The regency had three members, one of whom was Ferdinand's second son, Prince Nicholas.

Honours
He received the following honours:

Ancestry

References

 Wolbe, Eugen:Ferdinand I – Întemeietorul României Mari (Ferdinand I, founder of Greater Romania), Humanitas, 2006.

External links

 

1865 births
1927 deaths
20th-century Kings of Romania
Great Union (Romania)
People from Sigmaringen
People temporarily excommunicated by the Catholic Church
Romanian people of World War I
Romanian people of the Hungarian–Romanian War
Romanian Roman Catholics
Extra Knights Companion of the Garter
Knights of the Golden Fleece of Austria
Grand Crosses of the Order of Saint Stephen of Hungary
Grand Crosses of the Virtuti Militari
2
2
Grand Crosses of the Order of the Star of Romania
Grand Crosses of the Order of the Crown (Romania)
Recipients of the Order of Michael the Brave
Knights Grand Cross of the Order of Saints Maurice and Lazarus
People from the Province of Hohenzollern
Kings of Romania
Princes of Hohenzollern-Sigmaringen
Roman Catholic monarchs
Honorary members of the Romanian Academy
Romanian people of French descent
Romanian people of German descent
Romanian people of Portuguese descent
Honorary Knights Grand Cross of the Order of the Bath
Burials at Curtea de Argeş Cathedral